A number of local elections took place in Mexico during 2004:

July 4, 2004

Chihuahua
Governor, state congress, and mayors
See: 2004 Chihuahua state election

Durango
Governor, state congress, and mayors
See: 2004 Durango state election

Zacatecas
Governor, state congress, and mayors
See: 2004 Zacatecas state election

August 1, 2004

Aguascalientes
Governor, state congress, and mayors
See: 2004 Aguascalientes state election

Baja California
State congress and five mayors
See: 2004 Baja California state election

Oaxaca
Governor, state congress, and mayors
See: 2004 Oaxaca state election

September 5, 2004

Veracruz
Governor, state congress, and mayors
See: 2004 Veracruz state election

November 14, 2004

Puebla
Governor, state congress, and mayors
See: 2004 Puebla state election

Sinaloa
Governor, state congress, and mayors
See: 2004 Sinaloa state election

Tamaulipas
Governor, state congress, and mayors
See: 2004 Tamaulipas state election

Tlaxcala
Governor, state congress, and mayors
See: 2004 Tlaxcala state election

See also
Politics of Mexico
List of political parties in Mexico